In Mormonism, the Melchizedek priesthood, also referred to as the high priesthood of the holy order of God or the Holy Priesthood, after the Order of the Son of God, is the greater of the two orders of priesthood, the other being the Aaronic priesthood.

According to Joseph Smith, the name of this priesthood became Melchizedek "because Melchizedek was such a great high priest" and "to avoid the too frequent repetition" of the "name of the Supreme Being".

In the Church of Jesus Christ of Latter-day Saints
In the Church of Jesus Christ of Latter-day Saints (LDS Church), the largest Latter Day Saint denomination, priesthood holders meet at their ward or branch. Those who do not hold the priesthood are still invited and encouraged to attend with the elders quorum. However, priesthood duties can only be performed by those who are ordained.

Receiving the Melchizedek priesthood is considered to be a saving ordinance of the gospel in the LDS Church. A candidate for this ordination (worthy male member 18 years and older, regardless of how long they have been a member) is interviewed and often counseled to study the 84th, 107th, and 121st sections of the Doctrine and Covenants to begin to understand the oath and covenant of the priesthood, the covenant a person makes with God when he receives the Melchizedek priesthood. The candidate is also usually asked to stand in a gathering of the members of the church to be publicly accepted as being worthy of ordination.

Shortly after the establishment of the church, the ordination of black people to the priesthood was prohibited; following a revelation received by then-church president Spencer W. Kimball, the prohibition was lifted in 1978.

Hierarchy

Offices

Table notes

Comparison with other denominations 
In the theology, and unlike some other Christian denominations, the Melchizedek priesthood is thought to be held by common mortals and not solely by either pre-Aaronic priests such as Melchizedek, or Jesus alone, as most Protestants interpret the Epistle to the Hebrews. Smith taught that this priesthood was on the earth since Adam received it and conferred it upon his sons Abel and Seth, and it was conferred successively upon the early biblical patriarchs. Through it Enoch led his people to become so righteous and obedient that they qualified to be translated as the City of Enoch. Noah held this priesthood, as did Abraham, Isaac, and Jacob. It remained on earth until the time of Moses, who received it "under the hand of his father-in-law, Jethro" and it would have been given to the Israelites if they had been worthy of it and had not "hardened their hearts", however righteous Nephites held the priesthood called after the order of the Son of God because of "their exceeding faith".

Restoration account debate 
Joseph Smith and Oliver Cowdery said they were visited by "an angel of God... clothed with glory",, who Cowdery and Smith identified as John the Baptist and who laid his hands on their head and gave them the Aaronic priesthood. Smith described the event in detail and gave an exact date when it happened as May 15, 1829. In contrast, he never gave a description of any vision in which he saw an angel separately confer the Melchizedek priesthood. However, by the turn of the 20th century, Latter Day Saint theologians believed that such a separate ordination by angels had occurred prior to the organization of the Church of Christ on April 6, 1830. This was largely because the early church organization contained the office of elder, which at least by 1835 was considered an office of the Melchizedek priesthood. As evidence for such a pre-organization angelic conferral, writers referred to a revelation in which Smith said he heard "The voice of Peter, James, and John in the wilderness between Harmony, Susquehanna county, and Colesville, Broome county, on the Susquehanna river, declaring themselves as possessing the keys of the kingdom, and of the dispensation of the fulness of times!" Smith and Cowdery were visited by the three angels in 1829 and that they conferred the Melchizedek priesthood in the same way John the Baptist had conferred the Aaronic priesthood. However, the official church history, supervised or written by Smith, states that "the authority of the Melchizedek priesthood was manifested and conferred for the first time upon several of the Elders" during a General Conference in early June 1831. When Smith's official history was first published in 1902, the compiler B.H. Roberts thought that this was a mistake, because it would not be consistent with the common Mormon belief that the priesthood had been conferred prior to the church's founding in 1830. In History of the Church, Roberts wrote, "there is no definite account of the [Melchizedek Priesthood restoration] event in the history of the Prophet Joseph, or, for matter of that, in any of our annals."

On the other hand, some Mormon historians accept Smith's history as correct and consistent with other historical records showing that other Mormons present at the conference dated the restoration of the Melchizedek priesthood to 1831. This conference had been a very significant event in the early church history, coming soon after the conversion of Sidney Rigdon, who believed that Mormon missionaries lacked the necessary power to adequately preach the gospel.

In January 1831, Smith issued a revelation where he wrote that after Mormons relocated to Kirtland, Ohio, they would "be endowed with power from on high" and "sent forth". In a revelation given to an individual, Smith assured the man that "at the conference meeting he [would] be ordained unto power from on high". One of Smith's associates that was present at the conference expressed the view that this ordination "consisted [of] the endowment--it being a new order--and bestowed authority", and later that year, an early convert who had left the church claimed that many of the Saints "have been ordained to the High Priesthood, or the order of Melchizedek; and profess to be endowed with the same power as the ancient apostles were". In 1835, the historical record was muddled a bit when the first edition of the Doctrine and Covenants altered pre-1831 revelations to make a distinction between the Aaronic and Melchizedek priesthoods, and to classify the offices of elder and apostle as part of the Melchizedek priesthood.

References

Bibliography 

.
.
.
.

Latter Day Saint hierarchy
 Mel
1829 establishments in the United States
1829 in Christianity
Latter Day Saint terms
Melchizedek